The 2017 Samarkand Challenger was a professional tennis tournament played on clay courts. It was the 21st edition of the tournament which was part of the 2017 ATP Challenger Tour. It took place in Samarkand, Uzbekistan between 15 and 20 May 2017.

Singles main-draw entrants

Seeds

 1 Rankings are as of May 8, 2017.

Other entrants
The following players received wildcards into the singles main draw:
  Farrukh Dustov
  Sanjar Fayziev
  Temur Ismailov
  Kenneth Raisma

The following player received entry into the singles main draw as a special exempt:
  Cem İlkel

The following players received entry from the qualifying draw:
  Evgeny Karlovskiy
  Kevin Krawietz
  Denys Molchanov
  Danilo Petrović

Champions

Singles

 Adrián Menéndez Maceiras def.  Aldin Šetkić 6–4, 6–2.

Doubles

 Laurynas Grigelis /  Zdeněk Kolář def.  Prajnesh Gunneswaran /  Vishnu Vardhan 7–6(7–2), 6–3.

References

Samarkand Challenger
Samarkand Challenger
2017 in Uzbekistani sport
May 2017 sports events in Asia